Marcel Musters (born 6 June 1959) is a Dutch actor.

In 2019, he won the Golden Calf for Best Actor award for his role in the film God Only Knows directed by Mijke de Jong. In 2020, a print of his hand was added to the 'Walk of Fame' in the Vinkenburgstraat in Utrecht, Netherlands.

Awards 

 2019: Golden Calf for Best Actor, God Only Knows

Selected filmography 

 1990: Crocodiles in Amsterdam
 1996: Laagland
 2004: The Preacher
 2005: Offers
 2010: Dik Trom
 2019: God Only Knows

References

External links 
 

Living people
1959 births
20th-century Dutch male actors
21st-century Dutch male actors
Dutch male actors
Dutch male film actors
Dutch male television actors
Golden Calf winners